Asiabar (Aciabar) (also Romanized as Āsīābar and Āsīyābar) is a village in Deylaman Rural District, Deylaman District, Siahkal County, Gilan Province, Iran. At the 2006 census, its population was 479, in 169 families.

References 

Populated places in Siahkal County